Hit the ball twice, or "double-hit", is a method of dismissal in the sport of cricket. Its occurrence in modern cricket is exceptionally rare.

Definition
Law 34.1 of the Laws of Cricket states:
 
34.1 Out Hit the ball twice

34.1.1 The striker is out Hit the ball twice if, while the ball is in play, it strikes any part of his/her person or is struck by his/her bat and, before the ball has been touched by a fielder, the striker wilfully strikes it again with his/her bat or person, other than a hand not holding the bat, except for the sole purpose of guarding his/her wicket.
34.1.2 For the purpose of this Law ‘struck’ or ‘strike’ shall include contact with the person of the striker.
A player can hit the ball twice in order to prevent it from hitting his/her stumps but not with a hand that is not in contact with the bat and not if doing so prevents a catch being taken (in which case they would be out obstructing the field). The bowler does not get credit for the wicket.

History
Cricket is often considered to be a rather gentle pastime but it has a history of extreme violence.  In its early days, before the modern rules had universal effect, batsmen could go to almost any lengths to avoid being out.  They could obstruct the fielders and they could hit the ball as many times as necessary to preserve their wicket.  This had fatal consequences on more than one occasion and, ultimately, strict rules were introduced to prevent the batsman from physically attacking the fielders.

In 1622, several parishioners of Boxgrove, near Chichester in West Sussex, were prosecuted for playing cricket in a churchyard on Sunday 5 May.  There were three reasons for the prosecution: one was that it contravened a local by-law; another reflected concern about church windows which may or may not have been broken; the third was that "a little childe had like to have her braines beaten out with a cricket batt".

The latter situation was because the rules at the time allowed the batsman to hit the ball more than once and so fielding near the batsman was very hazardous, as two later incidents confirm.

In 1624, a fatality occurred at Horsted Keynes in East Sussex when a fielder called Jasper Vinall was struck on the head by the batsman, Edward Tye, who was trying to hit the ball a second time to avoid being caught.  Vinall is thus the earliest known cricketing fatality.  The matter was recorded in a coroner's court, which returned a verdict of misadventure.

In 1647, another fatality was recorded at Selsey, West Sussex, when a fielder called Henry Brand was hit on the head by a batsman trying to hit the ball a second time.

It is not known when the rules were changed to outlaw striking for the ball a second time or when the offence of obstructing the field was introduced, but both those rules were clearly stated in the 1744 codification of the Laws of Cricket, which were drawn up by the London Cricket Club and are believed to be based on a much earlier code that has been lost.

The first definite record of a batsman being dismissed for hitting the ball twice occurred in the Hampshire v Kent match at Windmill Down on 13–15 July 1786.  Tom Sueter of Hampshire, who had scored 3, was the player in question, as recorded in Scores and Biographies.

Unusual dismissal
An example of the dismissal occurred in 1906 when John King, playing for Leicestershire against Surrey at The Oval tried to score a run after playing the ball twice to avoid getting bowled. Had he not tried to score a run, he would not have been out. Based on the history of the game, this method of dismissal is the second rarest after timed out, recorded merely on twenty-one occasions, although in modern times timed out has become more common.

One relatively recent example of a batsman being out "Hit the ball twice" was Kurt Wilkinson's dismissal when playing for Barbados against Rest of Leeward Islands in the 2002–03 Red Stripe Bowl. The dismissal was controversial as there was doubt as to whether Wilkinson had "wilfully" struck the ball twice as required under the relevant law of cricket.

See also
 List of unusual dismissals in international cricket

References

External sources
 The official laws of cricket

Cricket laws and regulations
Cricket terminology